This is a list of all the opinions written by Ian Binnie during his tenure as puisne justice of the Supreme Court of Canada.

1998

1999

2000

2001

2002

2003

2004

2005

2006

2007

2008

2009

2010
{| width=100%
|-
|
{| width=100% align=center cellpadding=0 cellspacing=0
|-
! bgcolor=#CCCCCC | Statistics
|-
|

2011
{| width=100%
|-
|
{| width=100% align=center cellpadding=0 cellspacing=0
|-
! bgcolor=#CCCCCC | Statistics
|-
|

2012

{| width=100%
|-
|
{| width=100% align=center cellpadding=0 cellspacing=0
|-
! bgcolor=#CCCCCC | Statistics
|-
|

Binnie